Storm Lake Municipal Airport  is a city-owned public-use airport located in Storm Lake, Iowa, United States. The airport is mostly used for general aviation.

Facilities and aircraft 
For the 12-month period ending May 7, 2009, the airport had 19,600 aircraft operations for an average of 54 per day. There are 37 aircraft based at this airport: 36 single-engine and 1 jet.

References

External links
 Official website

Airports in Iowa
Transportation buildings and structures in Buena Vista County, Iowa
Storm Lake, Iowa